The Saanich Predators are a junior "B" ice hockey team based in Saanich, British Columbia, Canada. They are members of the South Division of the Vancouver Island Junior Hockey League (VIJHL). Formerly known as the Saanich Braves, they play their home games at George Pearkes Arena. Norm Kelly is the team's president and general manager, Sam Waterfield is the coach and they are captained by forward Jack Rachwalski.

In July 2020, team ownership announced a rebrand in respect to the First Nations communities. By September, the Saanich Predators was chosen over other finalist suggestions: Saanich Squid, and the Saanich Defenders. https://saanichbraves.ca/media-release/

History

The Braves joined the league in 1967 as an original VIJHL team. In its VIJHL history, the team has won the Cyclone Taylor Cup once, in 1976. The Braves have won the Brent Patterson Memorial Trophy seven times; in 1976, 1978, 1979, 1980, 1984, 1988, and 1996. They won the Andy Hebenton Trophy ten times, as the team with the league's best regular season record in 1975, 1976, 1977, 1978, 1979, 1983, 1987, 1994, 1995, and 1996.

Season-by-season record

Note: GP = Games played, W = Wins, L = Losses, T = Ties, OTL = Overtime Losses, Pts = Points, GF = Goals for, GA = Goals against

NHL alumni

Awards and trophies

Cyclone Taylor Cup
1975-76

Brent Patterson Memorial Trophy
1975-76, 1977–78, 1978–79, 1979–80, 1983–84, 1987–88, 1995–96

Andy Hebenton Trophy
1974-75, 1975–76, 1976–77, 1977–78, 1978–79, 1982–83, 1986–87, 1993–94, 1994–95, 1995–96

Grant Peart Memorial Trophy
1980-81, 1989–90, 1990–91, 1991–92, 1992–93, 2001–02

Doug Morton Trophy
Rob Coldwell: 1974-75
Mike Jones: 1986-87
Garry Elander: 1987-88
Spencer Goodson: 1994-95
Mark Johnston: 1997-98
Ty Jones: 2010-11

Jamie Robertson Trophy
Mike Shemilt: 1975-76
Murray McLaren: 1976-77
Craig Eversfield: 1981-82
Roy Clark: 1990-91
Roy Clark: 1991-92
1994-95
Dean Golbeck: 1996-97
Trevor Yee: 2008-09

Jamie Benn Trophy
Ty Jones: 2010-11

Larry Lamoureaux Trophy
Spencer Goodson: 1994-95
A.J. Gale: 2002-03
Ty Jones: 2008-09
Jack Palmer: 2010-11

Ray's Sports Centre Trophy
Steve Hanna: 1974-75
Mike Duch: 1975-76
Mike Duch: 1976-77
Steve Hanna: 1977-78
Marty Wakelyn: 1978-79
Alf Orton: 1982-83
Shon Hunter: 1986-87
Jacob Matychuk: 1992-93
1993-94
 Tanner McGaw: 2011-12

Walt McWilliams Memorial Trophy
Steve McKenzie: 1985-86
Ed Pratt: 1987-88
Norm Westhaver: 1988-89

External links
Official website of the Saanich Braves

Ice hockey teams in British Columbia
Saanich, British Columbia